Balef Kola-ye Gharbi (also Romanized as Bālef Kolā-ye Gharbī) is a village in Deraz Kola Rural District, Babol Kenar District, Babol County, Mazandaran Province, Iran. At the 2006 census, its population was 105, in 33 families.

References 

Populated places in Babol County